William Stallings is an American author. He has written computer science textbooks on operating systems, computer networks, computer organization, and cryptography.

Early life 
Stallings earned his B.S. in electrical engineering from University of Notre Dame and his PhD in computer science from Massachusetts Institute of Technology.

Career 
He maintains a website titled Computer Science Student Resource. He has authored 17 titles, and counting revised editions, a total of over 40 books on these subjects. He has been a technical contributor, technical manager, and an executive with several high-technology firms. He works as an independent consultant whose clients have included computer and networking manufacturers and customers, software development firms, and leading-edge government research institutions.

Recognition 
He was awarded Computer Science textbook of the year from the Text and Academic Authors Association three times.

Books

 Computer Organization and Architecture
 Cryptography and Network Security: Principles and Practice
 Data and Computer Communications
 Operating Systems - Internals and Design Principles
 Wireless Communications & Networks
 Computer Security: Principles and Practice
 Local and Metropolitan Area Networks
 Network Security Essentials: Applications and Standards
 Business Data Communications - Infrastructure, Networking and Security

References

External links
Williamstallings.com - Website for the books of William Stallings
Computer Science Student Resource Site

American computer scientists
21st-century American engineers
American technology writers
University of Notre Dame alumni
MIT School of Engineering alumni
Year of birth missing (living people)
Living people